Charles Pyngrope is an Indian politician from the state of Meghalaya who has been appointed the State President of All India Trinamool Congress, Meghalaya. He was the Speaker of the Meghalaya Legislative Assembly from 2009-2013 under the United Democratic Party. He was also a prominent Minister in The Government of Meghalaya and presently serves in the capacity of Chairman, Meghalaya Forest Development Corporation. Aside from his current governmental responsibilities, Charles Pyngrope is also involved significantly in community development, environmental sustainability initiatives, and several charitable initiatives to further the cause of education, all of which are executed under his flagship enterprise, Windermere Holdings, where he is the chairman and brainforce behind the drive to raise the profile of his beloved State.

He is currently representing Nongthymmai in the Meghalaya Legislative Assembly.

References

Meghalaya politicians
National People's Party (India) politicians
Living people
Speakers of the Meghalaya Legislative Assembly
State cabinet ministers of Meghalaya
Meghalaya MLAs 2013–2018
Meghalaya MLAs 2018–2023
Trinamool Congress politicians from Meghalaya
1960 births